Palabas is the debut studio album by Filipino rock band Sponge Cola. It was released on October 18, 2004, under Sony Music Philippines. This album contains some songs that the band members made even before the group was officially formed, and includes an abundance of Tagalog-language tracks.

Palabas spawned the singles "KLSP", "Lunes", "Gemini", "Una", and "Jeepney". An additional song, "Dragonfly", was released as online single in April 2006. The album was certified Gold by the Philippine Association of the Record Industry (PARI) in 2005 with sales of 15,000 physical CD copies. To date the album has sold over 28,000 pure CD copies.

In 2005, Sponge Cola released a repackaged edition of the album with a bonus CD that contains a music video for "Gemini", and some bonus audio tracks, including a remastered version of "Gemini", acoustic versions of "KLSP" and "Jeepney", and an unreleased track titled "Boundless".

In December 2013, Palabas was re-issued as part of Palabas & Transit Collection, a release that also includes the deluxe edition of Sponge Cola's second album, Transit.

Background
Palabas means a "show / program" or "to come out" in Tagalog.

Track listing

Personnel
Sponge Cola
Yael Yuzon -  vocals, rhythm guitar
Gosh Dilay - bass guitar
Erwin Armovit - lead guitar
Chris Cantada - drums, backing vocals

Album Credits
Drums Recorded by: Louie Talan at the Wombworks Studios
Recorded at: The Three Studios
Mixed by: Sponge Cola at the Three Studios and By Mong Alcaraz & Jorel Corpuz at Funkville Studios
Mastered by: Zach Lucero
Additional Guitar tracks for tracks 2,5 & 12 recorded at: Knive Studios
Album Cover Design & Layout by: Jade Maravillas
Photography by: Raymond Fabul

Accolades

References

2004 debut albums
2004 albums
Sponge Cola albums